Ryabenko, Russian, Ukrainian Рябенко, is a Slavic surname. Notable people with the surname include:

Aleksandr Ryabenko, Soviet KGB general
Konstantin Ryabenko (born 1983), Ukrainian ice hockey player
Vasily Ryabenko (born 1934), Soviet footballer

Russian-language surnames